Café Racers is the eighth studio album by American singer Kim Carnes, released in October 1983 by EMI.

The album spawned three chart singles in the United States, "Invisible Hands", "You Make My Heart Beat Faster (And That's All That Matters)", and "I Pretend" which charted on various Billboard charts. "The Universal Song" was also released as a single in West Germany, Austria, Switzerland, the Netherlands and Scandinavia.

The song "I'll Be Here Where the Heart Is" was included on the chart-topping, six times Platinum Flashdance soundtrack which received a Grammy Award for Best Album Of Original Score Written for a Motion Picture at 26th Annual Grammy Awards. It was also released as a single in Germany, Netherlands, Spain and France.

The album was not as successful as Mistaken Identity (1981) or Voyeur (1982), peaking at No. 97 on the  Billboard 200 chart.

Background
Following Mistaken Identity (1981) and Voyeur (1982), Carnes intended to continue working with producer Val Garay for her third album with EMI. Garay was occupied producing Little Robbers for The Motels, so Carnes approached Keith Olsen, who had recently produced her hit "I'll Be Here Where the Heart Is" for the Flashdance soundtrack.

Release and promotion 
Café Racers was released in October 1983.

"Invisible Hands" was released as the album's lead single in October 1983. It spent a total of twelve weeks on the Billboard Hot 100 chart, peaking at no. 40 for two consecutive weeks. It peaked slightly higher on the Cash Box Top 100 chart at no. 34. In Canada, "Invisible Hands" peaked at no. 44. "You Make My Heart Beat Faster (And That's All That Matters)" followed as the album's second single in January 1984. It peaked at no. 54 on the Billboard Hot 100, and no. 15 on the Billboard Dance Club Songs chart. "I Pretend" was released as the album's third single in May 1984. It peaked at no. 74 on the Billboard Hot 100, and no. 10 on the Billboard Adult Contemporary chart. "The Universal Song" was released exclusively in the Netherlands, where it peaked at no. 40 in January 1984. "Young Love" was released exclusively in Canada, and a remix of "Hurricane" by Rusty Garner was released in the United States.

Critical reception
Billboard opined that Café Racers was "superior" to Carnes' previous album Voyeur, and that it "captures both sides of Carnes' music – the trendy and the timeless".

In a retrospective review for AllMusic, Stephen Thomas Erlewine described Café Racers as "a snapshot of the various styles and sounds of mainstream radio circa 1983". He proposed that the album's commercial failure was due to a lack of hit record material, and suggested that the abundance of single remixes that were sent to radio stations added "an air of desperation" to Café Racers.

Track listing

Charts

Personnel 

Musicians
 Kim Carnes – lead vocals, backing vocals (3, 6, 7, 9, 10) 
 Bill Cuomo – keyboards (1, 2, 4, 5, 7-10), synthesizers (3), keyboard solo (6) 
 Steve Porcaro – keyboards (2) 
 David Paich – acoustic piano (3), keyboard bass (6) 
 Duane Hitchings – keyboards (10) 
 Chas Sandford – guitars (1, 4, 5), backing vocals (1, 4, 5) 
 Steve Lukather – guitar solo (1), guitars (2, 3, 6, 7, 9) 
 Waddy Wachtel – guitars (2, 3, 10), backing vocals (2)
 Mark Andes – bass guitar (2, 3, 6, 7, 9) 
 Dennis Carmassi – drums (1-7, 9, 10)
 Brian Fairweather – Simmons drums (6), backing vocals (5, 6, 7)
 Craig Krampf – drums (8) 
 Keith Olsen – percussion (3)
 Jerry Peterson – saxophone (3, 4, 7)
 Martin Page – backing vocals (5, 6, 7), Roland Jupiter 8 (6) 
 Kevin Chalfant – backing vocals (7) 
 John Waite – backing vocals (8) 
 Daniel Moore – backing vocals (10) 
 Dave Ellingson – backing vocals (10)

Production 
 Keith Olsen – producer, engineer
 Dennis Sager – engineer 
 Greg Fulginiti – mastering
 Susan McGonigle – production coordinator 
 John Kosh – art direction, design 
 Ron Larson – art direction, design 
 Robert Blakeman – cover photography 
 Jackie Sallow – sleeve photography
 Michael Brokaw (Kragen & Co.) – direction

Studios 
 Recorded at Goodnight LA Studios (Van Nuys, CA).
 Mastered at Artisan Sound Recorders (Hollywood, CA).

Notes

1983 albums
Kim Carnes albums
Albums produced by Keith Olsen
EMI Records albums